The Gemini is a 2016 Burmese drama film directed by Nyo Min Lwin, starring Okkar Min Maung, Nyein Chan Kyaw and Aye Myat Thu. The film follows a love story between two men who had faced difficulties in their life after one had been forced into an arranged marriage. The film was the first LGBT film in cinema of Myanmar and openly railed against the Burmese homosexuality laws.

The Gemini premiered at the Cinema Village in New York City on 9 September 2016, and became the first Burmese film shown in Hollywood.

Plot
The film begins with a scene of bed sheets pooling on the floor and two men swing their legs into view. The film cuts to a cold discussion between Thit Wai and his wife, Honey Pyo. Later, Honey Pyo is shattered when she learns that her husband's plane has crashed.

Nay Thit approaches the young widow at the funeral claiming to be his college friend. Flashbacks reveal the romantic relationship between Thit Wai and Nay Thit, and Honey Pyo suspects her late husband is with Nay Thit which she decides to investigate.

Cast
 Okkar Min Maung as Thit Wai 
 Nyein Chan Kyaw as Nay Thit
 Aye Myat Thu as Honey Pyo

Release and international showing
The film was first shown on 9 June 2016 at the Cinema Village in New York and shown on Laemmle Theatre in Los Angeles on 23 September 2016. The film was screened in Myanmar on 2 Dec 2016.

See also
LGBT rights in Myanmar

References

External links

 

2016 films
2010s Burmese-language films
Films set in Myanmar
Gay-related films
Burmese LGBT-related films
2016 LGBT-related films